"Rain" is a song by Mika, released as the second single from his second studio album, The Boy Who Knew Too Much. The song was produced and mixed by Greg Wells and features violinist Owen Pallett.

Description
The song's lyrics are taken from a break-up letter that Mika wrote to an ex.  

In an interview with Q magazine, Mika says:  Keira performed Mika's song at Australian Idol's grand finale along with "We Are Golden". On 5 February 2010 Mika performed a special operatic version of the song in a duet with opera star Danielle de Niese on the ITV1 show 'Popstar to Operastar'.

Reception
The song received very positive reviews from most critics. Nick Levene from Digital Spy gave to the song 4 stars (out of 5) and said: "Those unconvinced that much had changed when Mika returned with 'We Are Golden' this summer should be pleasantly surprised by 'Rain', the second single from his second album. The shrieking has been reined in, the nursery rhyme hooks have been ditched and instead we're treated to a concoction of shimmering synths, layered vocals and throbbing, clubby beats. As it builds towards a crescendo that's both intriguingly dark and glitteringly magical, Mika proves he's perfectly capable of channelling his hyperactivity in the right direction. Here's hoping for more of this in the future".
Heather Phares from Allmusic says that "Rain" is a kissing cousin to "Relax"'s pulsing, melancholy disco-pop.

Music video

The music video for "Rain" was filmed in Epping Forest in Essex and premiered online on 16 October 2009. It was directed by Nez Khammal. The video is set in a dark enchanted forest with Mika waking up in a colourful tent. He is soon joined by various strangely dressed imps and creatures who dance around him at first but chase him out of the forest amid exploding fireworks.

Notable Performances
Mika sang "Rain" at the Royal Variety Performance in 2009 before Queen Elizabeth II.

Track listing

Credits
Mika – vocals, keyboards, background vocals
Chris Nicolaides – background vocals
Owen Pallett – violin
Tim Pierce – guitar
Dan Rothchild – background vocals
Greg Wells – keyboards, drums, bass, percussion, programming
Martin Waugh – background vocals
Stuart Price – Programming (uncredited)

Charts and certifications
The single was released on 23 November 2009 in the United Kingdom in both digital and physical formats. The single peaked at #72 on the UK Singles Chart, making this Mika's lowest charting UK single. Casablanca Records believed this was due to low promotional airplay on UK Radio. The song was received better in continental Europe, where it peaked at #4 in Italy, being certified platinum by the Federation of the Italian Music Industry.
It also peaked inside the Top 40 in the Netherlands and Spain, and debuted at #8 in Wallonia. The single debuted at #5 in French Singles Chart and peaked #16 in Digital Singles Chart.

Weekly charts

Year-end charts

Certifications

References

2009 singles
Mika (singer) songs
Songs written by Mika (singer)
Song recordings produced by Greg Wells
Songs written by Jodi Marr
2009 songs
Casablanca Records singles